Poland Street is a street in the Soho district of the City of Westminster, London.  It runs from Oxford Street in the north to Broadwick Street in the south.  It was named after the "King of Poland" pub, which was renamed in honour of Poland's King John III Sobieski in the heading of a coalition of western armies, crucially defeated the invading Ottoman forces at the 1683 Battle of Vienna. In the eighteenth century, Polish Protestants settled around Poland Street as religious refugees fleeing the Polish Counterreformation.

It was the site of the St James Workhouse whose infirmary may have been the original St. James Infirmary (see plan). The lane that led into the workhouse in now the driveway to Q-Park Soho garage.

Notable residents
The poet Percy Bysshe Shelley lived at 15 Poland Street.

The poet William Blake lived at 28 Poland Street until 1791. The original building has since been rebuilt.

The writer Fanny Burney had her childhood home (1760–1770) at 50 Poland Street. In 1909, nearby Portland Street was renamed D'Arblay Street in her honour, after her married name of Madame D'Arblay. Her father was the musicologist Charles Burney, whose other children, also living there, included writer Sarah Burney, explorer James Burney, and classicist Charles Burney.

Charles Thomas Bale was a still life painter who worked in London during the second half of the 19th century. Little is known of the artist's life, except that he lived at 9 Poland Street in London in 1872.

References

External links

Streets in the City of Westminster
Soho, London